The Cayemite short-tailed amphisbaena (Amphisbaena cayemite) is a worm lizard species in the family Amphisbaenidae. It is endemic to Haiti.

References

Amphisbaena (lizard)
Reptiles described in 2006
Endemic fauna of Haiti
Reptiles of Haiti
Taxa named by Richard Thomas (herpetologist)
Taxa named by Stephen Blair Hedges